The Stranger is a collection of science fiction stories by American writer Gordon R. Dickson.  It was first published by Tor Books in 1987.  Most of the stories originally appeared in the magazines Fantasy and Science Fiction, Satellite, Imagination, Astounding, Saturn, Analog Science Fiction and Fact, Fantastic, Science Fiction Stories, Future and If.

Contents

 "God Bless Them"
 "James"
 "E Gubling Dow"
 "The Strange"
 "The Friendly Man"
 "MX Knows Best"
 "The Quarry"
 "Three-Part Puzzle"
 "IT, Out of Darkest Jungle"
 "The Green Building"
 "Tempus Non Fugit"
 "Cloak and Stagger"
 "And Then There Was Peace"
 "The Catch"

References

1987 short story collections
Short story collections by Gordon R. Dickson
Tor Books books